Aïn El Berd is a commune (baladiyah) in the Aïn El Berd district (daïra) in the Sidi Bel Abbès province (wilayah) of Algeria.  It is situated in the northwestern part of the country, in the Hauts Plateaux region, and has a typical Mediterranean climate.  Established as an official commune on April 15, 1886, Aïn El Berd is known for its beautiful countryside views and sites, as well as for its vineyards, olive trees, and wheat products.  During the French colonial era, the surrounding areas, then called Saint-Marc and Saint-Henri, gave wines of good quality, and in 1889 and 1900 won silver and gold medals, respectively.

Settlements 
Aïn El Berd Commune consists of two main settlements:
 Aïn El Berd - with a population of 12,179 is the capital of Aïn El Berd commune.  The colonial name was "Oued-Imbert", which is a contraction of its name Oued Aïn El Berd.  Before the French colonial era, Aïn El Berd was inhabited by the tribe of Ouled Sidi Ma'âchou.  It is situated 25 km from Sidi Bel Abbès and 57 km from Oran on national highway N13.
 Ouled Ali - population of 3,487.

Demographics 
During the French colonial era, the area around Aïn El Berd from Oran to Sidi-Bel-Abbès was heavily populated with French colonists, sometimes referred to as Pied-Noir.  After the massacre of Pieds-Noirs in Oran by the suburban Muslim population in which European people were shot, molested and brought to Petit-Lac slaughterhouse where they were tortured and executed, the Pied-Noir exodus began in earnest.  By September 1962, cities such as Oran and Sidi Bel Abbès were half-empty.

Despite losing so many people in the Pied-Noir exodus, the region is currently rebounding.  The population of the commune in 1933 was 41,645.  In 1998 the population was 13,779.  And according to the 2008 census, the population was 16,013.

Other 

 Aïn El Berd is the location of the mausoleum of Sidi (Saint) Ma'âchou, which attracts visitors from all around north-western Algeria.
 There is a celebration every autumn - the Waada of Aïn El Berd.
 Nearby spring: 'Ain Melegra 
 Nearby hill: Hammar Zahtar 
 Nearby mountain: Djebel Boû Rdjiyâ

See also 

 Algerian War
 Pied-Noir

References

External links
 http://enfantdeouedimbert.free.fr/livre1.html (website with map and photos of Aïn El Berd city)

Communes of Sidi Bel Abbès Province
Sidi Bel Abbès Province